Bogertophis is a genus of New World rat snakes in the family Colubridae. The genus is endemic to the southwestern United States and northern Mexico. There are two accepted species.

Etymology
The genus Bogertophis is named in honor of American herpetologist Charles Mitchill Bogert.

Species
The following two species are recognized as being valid.
Bogertophis rosaliae (Mocquard, 1899) – Baja California rat snake
Bogertophis subocularis (A. Brown, 1901) – Trans-Pecos rat snake

Nota bene: A binomial authority in parentheses indicates that the species was originally described in a genus other than Bogertophis.

Description
Bogertophis are long, slender snakes, with large eyes that have round pupils.

B. rosaliae is more variable in color, found in shades of tan, red, orange, or brown.

B. subocularis is almost universally tan in color with interconnected black blotches on the back and two black stripes down the neck. There is an isolated locality of B. subocularis where it is found with a light yellow coloration that is termed a "blonde" variant, and there is also an almost white coloration, that is sometimes referred to as the "silver" variant.

Behavior and diet
Bogertophis are typically nocturnal snakes that feed on a wide variety of rodents, bats and sometimes lizards, especially when younger. They are found in semi-arid habitats; so they spend much of their time hiding from the heat of the day.

Reproduction
Bogertophis species are oviparous.

In captivity
Both Bogertophis species are commonly available in the exotic pet trade. Due to their typically docile nature and reliable feeding habits, they can make an excellent choice for a captive snake. They are also well represented in zoos.

References

Further reading
Dowling, Herndon G.; Price, Robert M. (1988). "A proposed new genus for Elaphe subocularis and Elaphe rosaliae ". The Snake 20: 52–63. (Bogertophis, new genus).

External links

Rat Snakes of North America

Rat snakes
Vertebrates of Mexico
Reptiles of the United States
Snake genera